Anthony Ross Ferreira (born October 4, 1962) is a former Major League Baseball pitcher who played for one month, a September call up with the 1985 Kansas City Royals, logging in 38 days in the major leagues. He pitched two games and ended the season with 7.94 ERA during the 1985 Kansas City Royals season. Ferreira resides in Tarpon Springs, Florida.

External links

1962 births
Living people
Major League Baseball pitchers
Kansas City Royals players
Baseball players from California
Albany-Colonie Yankees players
American expatriate baseball players in Canada
El Paso Diablos players
Calgary Cannons players
Fort Myers Royals players
Jacksonville Suns players
Omaha Royals players
Phoenix Firebirds players
Tidewater Tides players